Greg Hayward is an Australian former professional rugby league footballer who played in the 1980s. He played for the Newcastle Knights in 1988 during their inaugural season.

Playing career
Hayward made his first grade debut for Newcastle in Round 9 1988 against St George.  Hayward went on to make 2 further appearances for the club in their first season.  Haywards last game in the top grade was a 18–16 loss against Balmain at Leichhardt Oval.

References

External links
http://www.rugbyleagueproject.org/players/Greg_Hayward/summary.html

Australian rugby league players
Newcastle Knights players
Living people
Place of birth missing (living people)
1963 births
Rugby league second-rows